Lyle Stathem Bettger (February 13, 1915 – September 24, 2003 )  was an American character actor who had roles in Hollywood films and television from the 1950s onward, often portraying villains. One such role was the wrathfully jealous elephant handler Klaus from the Oscar-winning film The Greatest Show on Earth (1952).

Early years
Bettger was born in Philadelphia, the son of Frank Bettger, an infielder for the St. Louis Cardinals, and Mertie Stathem Bettger. He graduated from the Haverford School in Haverford, Pennsylvania, and from the American Academy of Dramatic Arts in New York City.

Stage
Bettger's theatrical debut was in Brother Rat at the Biltmore Theatre in New York City in 1936. His Broadway credits include Dance Night (1938), Summer Night (1939), The Flying Gerardos (1940–1941), The Moon Is Down (1942), All for All (1943), Oh, Brother! (1945), John Loves Mary (1947–1948), and Love Life (1948–1949).

When Paramount sent a talent scout to see him, Bettger was signed to a three-year contract.

Film
Bettger's movie career began when he was cast in The Lie in 1949. Movie columnist Frank Neill reported, "On the basis of his performance in the movie, he has been signed to a juicy contract."

Later Bettger was cast as the villain in the film noir No Man of Her Own (1950). He soon became a regular on the set of Westerns such as Denver and Rio Grande (1952), The Great Sioux Uprising (1953), Forbidden (1953), Drums Across the River (1954), Destry (1955), The Lone Ranger, (1956) and Gunfight at the O.K. Corral (1957). Lyle developed a reputation for playing the bad guy and excelled in villainous roles such as the menacing Joe Beacom in Union Station (1950) and the cold-blooded Nazi Chief Officer Kirchner in The Sea Chase (1955). One of his later roles was in the 1969 film Impasse as a bigoted World War II veteran.

Radio
Programs on which Bettger appeared in old-time radio included Grand Central Station.

Television
Bettger made many appearances in dramatic roles on television, starring in the 1957 series The Court of Last Resort as well as guest starring on Hawaii Five-O, Rawhide, The Tall Man, The Rifleman, Gunsmoke (as Polk a murdering robber in 1962’s S9E22 - “The Kite”), Bonanza,, Combat!, Blue Light, The Time Tunnel, Death Valley Days, Laramie and Tales of Wells Fargo (as John Wesley Hardin).

Personal life
Bettger was married to Mary Gertrude Rolfe from 1941 to her death in 1996. They had three children: Lyle, Jr., Frank, and Paula. She was an actress who played Henry Aldrich's sister in The Aldrich Family on radio. Bettger and his family moved to Hawaii in the late 1960s.

Filmography

References

External links

1915 births
2003 deaths
Male actors from Philadelphia
American male film actors
American male television actors
Haverford School alumni
Western (genre) television actors
20th-century American male actors
Male Western (genre) film actors